Elisabetha Dorothea Schiller (née Kodweiß; 13 December 1732 – 29 April 1802) was a German innkeeper's daughter, notable as the mother of the playwright Friedrich Schiller.

Life
She was born in the small town of Marbach am Neckar to innkeeper Georg Friedrich Kodweiß (1698–1771) and his wife Anna Maria Munz (1698–1773). Anna was a farmer's daughter from the Röhracher Hof in Rietenau, whilst Georg was from a respectable family which had in earlier times had also managed the town's mayor's office. He acquired a certain wealth as innkeeper of the "Goldenen Löwen" in Marbach and had learned the trade of baking.

She died in Cleversulzbach, now part of Neuenstadt am Kocher.

Bibliography 
  Rudolf Schwan: Die Frau Majorin. Schillers Mutter in Cleversulzbach. Betulius, Stuttgart  / Mörike-Museum Cleversulzbach, Cleversulzbach 2007, ISBN 978-3-89511-102-0

External links 
  Letters by Schiller to his parents in the Friedrich-Schiller-Archiv
  Elisabetha Dorothea Schiller on the LEO-BW
  Receipt for „Qütten-Hüppen“ (Quitten-Hippen) in the Deutschen Literaturarchiv Marbach (PDF; 353 kB)

References 

1732 births
1802 deaths
People from Marbach am Neckar
Friedrich Schiller